Cuthbert Hamilton (1885–1959) was a British artist associated with the Vorticist movement and later with Group X. He was one of the pioneers of abstract art in Britain.

Cuthbert Hamilton went to the Slade School of Art and was a contemporary of Wyndham Lewis. In 1912 he helped with decorations for the Cave of the Golden Calf with Wyndham Lewis, and the next year he became part of the Omega Workshops.

In 1913 Wyndham Lewis argued with Roger Fry about a commission at the Omega Workshops. Hamilton left the workshops with other artists William Roberts, Frederick Etchells, Edward Wadsworth, and Henri Gaudier-Brzeska. They all supported Wyndham Lewis and united with him in March 1914, when he started the Rebel Art Centre. The artists were later on associated with the Vorticist art movement. Hamilton was one of the names signing the Vorticist manifesto and he also contributed material to the first issue of the Vorticist magazine Blast, (illus xviii Group).

He opened the Yeoman Pottery in Kensington in 1915/16. During World War I Hamilton was a Special Constable. After the war ended, he exhibited work with a new group Group X, which had been started by Lewis and Edward McKnight Kauffer also to be an avant-garde group.

Hamilton married the daughter of a powerful insurance businessman, and in 1920 he closed the Yeoman Pottery, giving up all his artistic work. He did not take part in any art exhibitions for the remainder of his life.

References

External links
 

1885 births
1959 deaths
20th-century English painters
English male painters
Vorticists
Alumni of the Slade School of Fine Art
Metropolitan Special Constabulary officers
Group X
20th-century English male artists